is a Japanese team handball player. She plays for the club Sony Semiconductor, and on the Japanese national team. She represented Japan at the 2013 World Women's Handball Championship in Serbia, where the Japanese team placed 14th.

References

1991 births
Living people
Japanese female handball players
Asian Games medalists in handball
Handball players at the 2014 Asian Games
Asian Games silver medalists for Japan
Medalists at the 2014 Asian Games
20th-century Japanese women
21st-century Japanese women